Kirklees Brook is a minor river in Greater Manchester, England.

Kirklees Brook springs from the slopes of Holcombe Moor at Grainings on the modern boundary with Lancashire, north of Hawkshaw, flowing south. At Brookhouse Mill between Greenmount and Tottington there are a number of small connected reservoirs. It is known as Woodhill Brook for a short stretch before joining the River Irwell in the Woodhill area of Bury.

References

Rivers of Greater Manchester
1Kirklees